Split (historically known as Spalato (from Venetian and  Italian); see other names) is the second-largest city of  Croatia, the largest city in Dalmatia and the largest city on the Croatian coast. It lies on the eastern shore of the Adriatic Sea and is spread over a central peninsula and its surroundings. An intraregional transport hub and popular tourist destination, the city is linked to the Adriatic islands and the Apennine Peninsula.

The city was founded as the Greek colony of Aspálathos in the 3rd or 2nd century BC on the coast of the Illyrian , and in 305 AD, it became the site of the Palace of the Roman emperor Diocletian. It became a prominent settlement around 650 when it succeeded the ancient capital of the Roman province of Dalmatia, Salona. After the sack of Salona by the Avars and Slavs, the fortified Palace of Diocletian was settled by Roman refugees. Split became a Byzantine city. Later it drifted into the sphere of the Republic of Venice and the Kingdom of Croatia, with the Byzantines retaining nominal suzerainty. For much of the High and Late Middle Ages, Split enjoyed autonomy as a free city of the Dalmatian city-states, caught in the middle of a struggle between Venice and Croatia for control over the Dalmatian cities.

Venice eventually prevailed and during the early modern period Split remained a Venetian city, a heavily fortified outpost surrounded by Ottoman territory. Its hinterland was won from the Ottomans in the Morean War of 1699, and in 1797, as Venice fell to Napoleon, the Treaty of Campo Formio rendered the city to the Habsburg monarchy. In 1805, the Peace of Pressburg added it to the Napoleonic Kingdom of Italy and in 1806 it was included in the French Empire, becoming part of the Illyrian Provinces in 1809. After being occupied in 1813, it was eventually granted to the Austrian Empire following the Congress of Vienna, where the city remained a part of the Austrian Kingdom of Dalmatia until the fall of Austria-Hungary in 1918 and the formation of Yugoslavia. In World War II, the city was annexed by Italy, then liberated by the Partisans after the Italian capitulation in 1943. It was then re-occupied by Germany, which granted it to its puppet Independent State of Croatia. The city was liberated again by the Partisans in 1944, and was included in the post-war Socialist Yugoslavia, as part of its republic of Croatia. In 1991, Croatia seceded from Yugoslavia amid the Croatian War of Independence.

Name
The name Aspálathos or Spálathos may come from the spiny broom (Calicotome spinosa, ασπάλαθος in Greek), although it is the related Spanish broom (Spartium junceum, σπάρτος) that is common in the area.

In Latin, the name became Spalatum or Aspalatum, which in the Middle Ages evolved into Aspalathum, Spalathum, Spalatrum, and Spalatro in the Dalmatian language of the city's Romance population. The Croatian term became Split or Spljet, while the Italian-language version, Spalato, became universal in international usage by the Early Modern Period. In the late 19th century, the Croatian name increasingly came to prominence, and officially replaced Spalato in the Kingdom of Yugoslavia after World War I.

Formerly, the name was thought to be related to Latin palatium 'palace', a reference to Diocletian's Palace. Various theories were developed, such as the notion that the name derives from S. Palatium, an abbreviation of Salonae Palatium. The erroneous "palace" etymologies were notably due to Byzantine Emperor Constantine VII Porphyrogenitus, and were later mentioned by Thomas the Archdeacon. The city, however, is several centuries older than the palace.

History

Antiquity

Although the beginnings of Split are traditionally associated with the construction of Diocletian's Palace in 305, the city was founded several centuries earlier as the Greek colony of Aspálathos, or Spálathos. It was a colony of the polis of Issa, the modern-day town of Vis, itself a colony of the Sicilian city of Syracuse. The exact year the city was founded is not known, but it is estimated to have been in the 3rd or 2nd century BC.
The Greek settlement lived off trade with the surrounding Illyrian tribes, mostly the Delmatae.

After the Illyrian Wars of 229 and 219 BC, the city of Salona, only a short distance from Spálathos, became the capital of the Roman Province of Dalmatia and one of the largest cities of the late empire with 60,000 people. The history of Spálathos becomes obscure for a while at this point, being overshadowed by that of nearby Salona, to which it would later become successor. The Roman Emperor Diocletian (ruled AD 284 to 305) in 293 began the construction of an opulent and heavily fortified palace fronting the sea, near his home town of Salona, selecting the site of Spálathos (or Spalatum in Latin).
The Palace was built as a massive structure, much like a Roman military fortress. The palace and the city of Spalatum which formed its surroundings were at times inhabited by a population as large as 8,000 to 10,000 people.

Between 475 and 480 the Palace hosted Flavius Julius Nepos, the last recognised Emperor of the Western Roman Empire. Salona was lost to the Ostrogothic Kingdom in 493, along with most of Dalmatia, but the Emperor Justinian I regained Dalmatia in 535–536.

Middle Ages

The Pannonian Avars sacked and destroyed Salona in 639; the surviving Romans fled to the nearby islands. The Dalmatian region and its shores were at this time settled by tribes of Croats, a South Slavic people subservient to the Avar khagans.
The Salonitans regained the land under Severus the Great in 650 and settled the 300-year-old Palace of Diocletian, which could not be effectively besieged by the Slavic tribes of the mainland. The Emperor Constans II granted them an Imperial mandate to establish themselves in the Palace as the City of Spalatum, which imposed upon the Croatian Slavs - at the time alied of Byzantium against the Avars - a cessation of hostilities. The Temple of Jupiter was rededicated to the Virgin Mary and the remains of the popular Saint Domnius were recovered from the ruins of Salona, later establishing the Cathedral of Saint Domnius as new seat of the Archbishop of Salona.

Until the Sack of Constantinople, Split remained a de jure possession of the Byzantine Empire as a Byzantine duchy, administered by the Exarchate of Ravenna and after 751 by Jadera (Zadar).
Its hinterland, however, was now home to the Duchy of the Croats. In this period, an independent Dalmatian language developed from Latin, with a distinct local dialect: to its inhabitants, the city became known as Spalatrum or Spalatro, one of the main Dalmatian city-states.

In 925 Tomislav's Kingdom of Croatia emerged in the hinterland of the city, centered in Nin as an ally of Byzantium against Simeon I of Bulgaria - though without receiving any power from the Emperor over the Dalmatian cities. The rise of the rival Bishopric of Nin, headed by Bishop Gregory, which attempted to institute the "Slavonic" or "Slavic language" as the language of religious service, led to the 925 Synod of Split, at which it was decreed that "no one should presume to celebrate the divine mysteries in the Slavonic language, but only in Latin and Greek, and that no one of that tongue should be advanced to the holy orders". 

In 1100, the bell tower which became the main symbol of the city was constructed and dedicated to Saint Domnius, by then regarded as the patron saint of the city.

Throughout the 9th and 10th centuries, Split was raided by the Narentines (a South Slavic confederation recognizing the King of Croatia as their sovereign). Therefore, the city offered its allegiance to Venice and in 998 the Venetian Doge Pietro II Orseolo, led a large naval expedition which defeated the Narentines the same year. After obtaining permission from Emperor Basil II in Constantinople, Orseolo proclaimed himself Duke of Dalmatia.
In 1019 the Byzantine Empire restored direct control over Dalmatia. The title "Duke of Dalmatia" seems to have been dropped at this point by the Venetian doges. In 1069 Peter Krešimir IV, King of Croatia, gained control over Dalmatian islands and cities, including Split, and stretched his rule south to Neretva. The coastal cities retained autonomous administration and were still nominally under Byzantine Empire, but were now subjects of the Croatian king.

After the death of Croatian King Stephen II in 1091, a period of succession crisis followed in Croatia, with King Ladislaus I of Hungary interfering in it. Byzantine Emperor Alexius took advantage of this and joined the old Theme of Dalmatia to the Empire. In 1096 Emperor Alexius, at the time engaged in the First Crusade, granted the administration of Dalmatia to the Doge of Venice.

In 1105 Coloman, King of Hungary, having conquered the Kingdom of Croatia, reneged on its alliance with Venice and moved on the coastal towns, besieging and taking Zadar. Split and Trogir decided then to surrender upon guarantee of their ancient privileges.
The rights granted to the city (and reaffirmed by new charters) were substantial. Split was to pay no tribute, it was to choose its own count and archbishop whom the king would confirm, it preserved its old Roman laws, and appointed its own judge. Dues from trade (which were substantial in the period), were divided between the count, the archbishop, and the king, and no foreigner was to live within the walls of the city against the will of the citizens. These rights were generally upheld by Hungarian kings, but there were inevitable incidents of violation.

After Coloman's death in 1116, the Doge Ordelafo Faliero returned from Outremer and retook all the Dalmatian cities, and also, for the first time, the Croatian cities of coast such as Biograd and Šibenik. In 1117, however, he was defeated and killed in renewed battle with the Hungarians under Stephen II of Hungary, and Split again acknowledged Hungarian rule. But the new Doge, Domenico Michiel, quickly defeated the Hungarians again and restored Venetian authority by 1118. In 1124, while the Doge was engaged against the Byzantine Empire (now hostile to Venice), Stephen II recovered Split and Trogir without resistance. Upon Michele's return in 1127, however, the Doge yet again expelled the Hungarians from the two cities and utterly destroyed Biograd, the favored seat of the Croatian Kings that the Hungarians were attempting to establish as a rival to the Venetian Zadar.

The cities remained in Venetian hands without contest during the reign of Béla II. But in 1141, his successor, King Géza II, having conquered Bosnian lands, marched to Split and Trogir, both voluntarily accepting him as overlord. This turned out to be a definitive conquest, as Venetian rule was not to return to Split for another 186 years.

In that period, however, Split was to see one brief (and final) restoration of Imperial power in Dalmatia. The Byzantine Emperor Manuel I Comnenus began his campaigns against the Kingdom of Croatia and Hungary in 1151, and by 1164, had secured the submission of the Dalmatian cities back under Imperial rule. Having won a decisive victory against Kingdom of Croatia and Hungary in 1167 at the Battle of Sirmium, consolidating his gains, the Emperor suddenly broke with Venice as well, and sent a fleet of 150 ships to the Adriatic. Split was to remain in Byzantine hands until Manuel's death in 1180, when Béla III of Hungary moved to restore Hungarian power in Dalmatia. The city remained loyal to the Empire, resisting the re-establishment of Hungarian rule, and consequently, upon its inevitable submission, was punished with the King's refusal to renew its ancient privileges.

During the 20-year Hungarian civil war between King Sigismund and the Capetian House of Anjou of the Kingdom of Naples, the losing contender, Ladislaus of Naples, sold his disputed rights on Dalmatia to the Venetian Republic for 100,000 ducats. Acting on the pretext, the Republic took over in the city by the year 1420.

Venetian period

By this time the population was largely Croatian, while Romance Dalmatian names were not as common, according to the Medieval city archives. The common language was Croatian, but a mixture of the Tuscan and Venetian dialects of the Italian language was also widely spoken by Dalmatian Italian notaries, school teachers, merchants, and officials. The city's autonomy was greatly reduced: the highest authority was a prince and captain (conte e capitanio), assigned by Venice.

Split eventually developed into a significant port-city, with important trade routes to the Ottoman-held interior through the nearby Klis pass. Culture flourished as well, Split being the hometown of Marko Marulić, the Croatian national poet. Marulić's most acclaimed work, Judita (1501), was an epic poem about Judith and Holofernes, widely held to be the first modern work of Croatian literature. It was written in Split and printed in Venice in 1521. 

The advances and achievements were reserved mostly for the aristocracy: the illiteracy rate was extremely high, mostly because Venetian rule showed little interest in educational and medical facilities.

In 1797 Split was ceded to the Habsburg monarchy by the Treaty of Campo Formio, as part of the dissolution and partition of the ancient Republic of Venice.

Napoleonic wars
Split became part of the Napoleonic Kingdom of Italy in 1805, after the defeat of the Third Coalition at the Battle of Austerlitz and the consequent Treaty of Pressburg. It was included directly in the French Empire in 1806. The same year, Vincenzo Dandolo was named provveditore generale and general Auguste de Marmont was named military commander of Dalmatia.

In 1809, after a brief war with France, Austria ceded Carinthia, Carniola, Croatia west of the Sava River, Gorizia and Trieste to France. These territories, along with Dalmatia, formed the Illyrian Provinces. During this period, large investments were undertaken in the city, new streets were built and parts of the ancient fortifications were removed.
Austria, with help from a British force led by Captain William Hoste, occupied Split in November 1813. Following the Congress of Vienna in 1815, the city was officially ceded to Austria.

Under Habsburg rule

The Split region became part of the Kingdom of Dalmatia, a separate administrative unit. After the revolutions of 1848 as a result of the romantic nationalism, two factions appeared. One was the pro-Croatian Unionist faction (later called the "Puntari", "Pointers"), led by the People's Party and, to a lesser extent, the Party of Rights, both of which advocated the union of Dalmatia with the Kingdom of Croatia-Slavonia which was under Hungarian administration. This faction was strongest in Split, and used it as its headquarters. The other faction was the pro-Italian Autonomist faction (also known as the "Irredentist" faction), whose political goals varied from autonomy within the Austro-Hungarian Empire, to a political union with the Kingdom of Italy.

The political alliances in Split shifted over time. At first, the Unionists and Autonomists were allied against the centralism of Vienna. After a while, when the national question came to prominence, they separated. Under Austria, however, Split can generally be said to have stagnated. The great upheavals in Europe in 1848 gained no ground in Split, and the city did not rebel.

Antonio Bajamonti became Mayor of Split in 1860 and – except for a brief interruption during the period 1864–65 – held the post for over two decades until 1880. Bajamonti was also a member of the Dalmatian Sabor (1861–91) and the Austrian Chamber of Deputies (1867–70 and 1873–79). In 1882 Bajamonti's party lost the elections and Dujam Rendić-Miočević, a prominent city lawyer, was elected to the post.

As part of Yugoslavia

Kingdom of Yugoslavia

After the end of World War I and the dissolution of Austria-Hungary, the province of Dalmatia, along with Split, became a part of the Kingdom of Serbs, Croats and Slovenes. Split was the site of a series of incidents between 1918 and 1920.
Since Rijeka, Trieste and Zadar, the three other large cities on the eastern Adriatic coast, were annexed by Italy, Split became the most important port in the Kingdom. The Lika railway, connecting Split to the rest of the country, was completed in 1925.
The country changed its name to the Kingdom of Yugoslavia in 1929, and the Port of Split became the seat of new administrative unit, Littoral Banovina. After the Cvetković-Maček agreement, Split became the part of new administrative unit (merging of Sava and Littoral Banovina plus some Croat populated areas), Banovina of Croatia in the Kingdom of Yugoslavia.

World War II

In April 1941, following the invasion of Yugoslavia by Nazi Germany, Split was occupied by Italy. Although Split formally became part of the Independent State of Croatia, the Ustaše were not able to establish and strengthen their rule in Split, as Italians assumed all power in Dalmatia. One month later on 18 May 1941, when the Treaties of Rome were signed, Italy formally annexed Split, which was included in the province of Spalato, and large parts of Dalmatia down to Kotor. The Italian Governatorate of Dalmatia hosted 390,000 inhabitants, of which 280,000 Croats, 90,000 Serbs and 5,000 Dalmatian Italians. 
Italian rule met heavy opposition from the Croat population as Split became a centre of anti-fascist sentiment in Yugoslavia. The first armed resistance group was organized on 7 May 1941; the 63 member strong 1st Strike Detachment (Prvi udarni odred) served as the basis for future formations, including the 1st Split Partisan Detachment. Between September and October 1941 alone, ten officials of the Italian fascist occupation were assassinated by the citizens. 
On 12 June 1942, a fascist mob attacked the city's synagogue, and destroyed its library and archive. Worshipers were beaten as they left the synagogue and Jewish-owned shops were targeted the following day.
The local football clubs refused to compete in the Italian championship; HNK Hajduk and RNK Split suspended their activities and both joined the Partisans along with their entire staff after the Italian capitulation provided the opportunity. Soon after Hajduk became the official football club of the Partisan movement.

In September 1943, following the capitulation of Italy, the city was temporarily controlled by Tito's brigades with thousands of people volunteering to join the Partisans of Marshal Josip Broz Tito (a third of the total population, according to some sources). 8,000 Italian soldiers from the 15th Infantry Division Bergamo prepared to fight alongside the Yugoslav Partisans against the Waffen SS Prinz Eugen. The Italian General Becuzzi handed over to the Partisans 11 soldiers which they considered as "war criminals; the Partisans also executed up to 41 members of the Italian Police forces, later found in mass graves.

A few weeks later, however, the Partisans were forced into retreat as the Wehrmacht placed the city under the authority of the Independent State of Croatia. The Germans decimated the Italian soldiers as traitors, including three Generals (Policardi, Pelligra and Cigala Fulgosi) and 48 officials (Trelj massacre). In this period the last remaining symbols of Italian heritage in Split, including several Venetian Lions of St. Mark, were erased from the town.

In a tragic turn of events, besides being bombed by axis forces, the city was also bombed by the Allies, causing hundreds of deaths. Partisans finally captured the city on 26 October 1944 and instituted it as the provisional capital of Croatia. On 12 February 1945 the Kriegsmarine conducted a daring raid on the Split harbour, damaging the British cruiser Delhi. After the war the remaining members of Dalmatian Italians of Split left Yugoslavia towards Italy (Istrian-Dalmatian exodus).

Federal Yugoslavia

After World War II, Split became a part of the Socialist Republic of Croatia, itself a constituent sovereign republic of the Socialist Federal Republic of Yugoslavia. During the period the city experienced its largest economic and demographic boom. Dozens of new factories and companies were founded with the city population tripling during the period. The city became the economic centre of an area exceeding the borders of Croatia and was flooded by waves of rural migrants from the undeveloped hinterland who found employment in the newly established industry, as part of large-scale industrialization and investment by the Yugoslav Federal Government.

The shipbuilding industry was particularly successful and Yugoslavia, with its Croatian shipyards, became one of the world's top nations in the field. Many recreational facilities were also constructed with federal funding, especially for the 1979 Mediterranean Games, such as the Poljud Stadium. The city also became the largest passenger and military port in Yugoslavia, housing the headquarters of the Yugoslav Navy (Jugoslavenska ratna mornarica, JRM) and the Army's Coastal Military District (equivalent of a field army). In the period between 1945 and 1990, the city was transformed and expanded, taking up the vast majority of the Split peninsula. In the same period it achieved an as yet unsurpassed GDP and employment level, still above the present day's, growing into a significant Yugoslav city.

Since independence

When Croatia declared its independence again in 1991, Split had a large garrison of Yugoslav People's Army (JNA) troops (drafted from all over Yugoslavia), as well as the headquarters and facilities of the Yugoslav Navy (JRM). This led to a tense months-long stand-off between the JNA and Croatian National Guard and police forces, occasionally flaring up in various incidents. The most tragic incident occurred on 15 November 1991, when the JRM light frigate Split fired a small number of shells at the city and its surroundings. The damage was insignificant but there were a few casualties. Three general locations were bombarded: the old city center, the city airport, and an uninhabited part of the hills above Kaštela, between the airport and Split. JRM sailors, most of them Croats themselves, who had refused to attack Croat civilians were left in the vessel's brig. The JNA and JRM evacuated all of its facilities in Split during January 1992. The 1990s economic recession soon followed.

In the years following 2000, Split finally gained momentum and started to develop again, with a focus on tourism. From being just a transport centre, Split is now a major Croatian tourist destination. Many new hotels are being built, as well as new apartment and office buildings. Many large development projects are being revived, and new infrastructure is being built. An example of one of the latest large city projects is the Spaladium Arena, built in 2009.

Geography

Split is situated on a peninsula between the eastern part of the Gulf of Kaštela and the Split Channel. The Marjan hill, rises in the western part of the peninsula. The Kozjak and Mosor ridges protect the city from the north and northeast, and separate it from the hinterland.

Climate

Split has a Mediterranean climate (Csa) in the Köppen climate classification. It has hot, moderately dry summers and mild, wet winters, which can occasionally feel cold, because of the strong northern wind bura. Winter is the wettest season; however, it can rain in Split at any time of the year. Snow is usually rare; since record-keeping began the months of December and January have accrued 1 snowy day on average, while February has averaged 2. In February 2012, Split received unusually large amount of snow which caused major problems with traffic. Split receives more than 2,600 sunshine hours annually. In July 2017 Croatian firefighters battled to control a forest fire along the Adriatic coast that damaged and destroyed buildings in villages around the city of Split.

Demographics

According to the 2011 census, the city of Split had 178,102 inhabitants.
Ethnically, Croats make up 96.23% of the population, and 86.15% of the residents of the city are Roman Catholics.

The settlements included in the administrative area of the City are:
Donje Sitno, population 313
Gornje Sitno, population 392
Kamen, population 1,769
Slatine, population 1,106
Split, population 167,121
Srinjine, population 1,201
Stobreč, population 4,978
Žrnovnica, population 3,222

The wider urban area of Split has 293,298 inhabitants, while there are 346,314 people in the Split metropolitan area. The urban area includes the surrounding towns and settlements: Okrug, Seget, Trogir, Kaštela, Solin, Podstrana, Dugi Rat and Omiš, while the metro area adds Marina, Primorski Dolac, Prgomet, Lećevica, Klis, Dugopolje, Dicmo, Trilj and Sinj. The entire Split-Dalmatia County has 454,798 residents, and the whole region of Dalmatia just under a million.

Inhabitants

Although the inhabitants of Split (Splićani) may appear to be a homogeneous body, they traditionally belong to three groups. The old urban families, the Fetivi, (short for "Fetivi Splićani", "real Split natives") are generally very proud of their city, its history and its distinctive traditional speech (a variant of the Chakavian dialect). The Fetivi, now a distinct minority, are sometimes referred to (semi-derogatorily) as "Mandrili" - and are augmented by the so-called Boduli, immigrants from the nearby Adriatic islands who mostly arrived over the course of the 20th century.

The above two groups are distinct, in the Mediterranean aspects of their ethnicity and traditional Chakavian speech, from the more numerous Shtokavian-speaking immigrants from the rural Zagora hinterland, referred to as the Vlaji (a term that sometimes carries negative connotations). The latter joined the Fetivi and Boduli as a third group in the decades since World War II, thronging the high-rise suburbs that stretch away from the centre. By now the Vlaji constitute a decided majority of inhabitants, causing a distinct shift in the overall ethnic characteristics of the city. Historically more influenced by Ottoman culture, their population merges almost seamlessly at the eastern border with the Herzegovinian Croats and southern Bosnia and Herzegovina in general. Local jokes have always condemned the Vlaji to playing the role of rural unsophisticates, although it is often conceded that it was their hard work in the industries of the post-WWII era that made modern-day Split what it is now.

Economy

Split's economy is still suffering the backlash from the recession caused by the transfer to a market economy and privatization. In the Yugoslav era, however, the city had been a highly significant economic centre with a modern and diverse industrial and economic base, including shipbuilding, food, chemical, plastics, textile, and paper industry, in addition to large revenues from tourism. In 1981 Split's GDP per capita was 37% above the Yugoslav average. Today, most of the factories are out of business (or are far below pre-war production and employment capacity) and the city has been trying to concentrate on commerce and services, consequently leaving an alarmingly large number of factory workers unemployed.

Brodosplit is the largest shipyard in Croatia. It employs around 2,300 people, and has built over 350 vessels, including many tankers, both panamax and non-panamax, as well as container ships, bulk carriers, dredgers, off-shore platforms, frigates, submarines, patrol boats and passenger ships. 80% of the ships built are exported to foreign contractors.

The new A1 motorway, integrating Split with the rest of the Croatian freeway network, has helped stimulate economic production and investment, with new businesses being built in the city centre and its wildly sprawling suburbs. The entire route was opened in July 2005. Today, the city's economy relies mostly on trade and tourism with some old industries undergoing partial revival, such as food (fishing, olive, wine production), paper, concrete and chemicals. Since 1998, Split has been host to the annual Croatia Boat Show.

Education

There are 24 primary schools and 23 secondary schools including 11 grammar schools.

University

The University of Split was founded in 1974. In the last few years it has grown to a large extent. Now it has 18,000 students and is organized in 12 faculties and 1 Academy (Arts Academy – Theatre department, Music department, Fine arts department and design). Split has the biggest university campus in Croatia with all the facilities. It houses all of the faculties, a large student centre with a sports hall, sporting grounds and a university library.

Culture

In 1979, the historic center of Split was included into the UNESCO list of World Heritage Sites. Split is said to be one of the centres of Croatian culture. Its literary tradition can be traced to medieval times, and includes names like Marko Marulić, while in more modern times Split excelled by authors famous for their sense of humor. Among them the most notable is Miljenko Smoje, famous for his TV series Malo misto and Velo misto, with the latter dealing with the development of Split into a modern city.

Despite colorful settings and characters, as well as a cinema tradition that could be traced to early 20th-century works of Josip Karaman, there were relatively few films shot in or around Split. However, the city did produce several famous actors, most notably Boris Dvornik.

Also well known is Ivo Tijardović, and his famous operetta "Little Floramye". Both Smoje and Tijardović are famous artists thought to represent the old Split traditions that are slowly dying out due to the city being overwhelmed by large numbers of rural migrants from the undeveloped hinterland.

Museums and galleries

The Archaeological Museum main collection is housed at Zrinsko-Frankopanska 25 in Split. There is also a branch building in Solin (Salona and Tusculum Collection) and two regional centres at Vid near Metković (Narona Collection), and on the island of Vis (Issa Collection). The Split Archaeological Museum is the oldest museum institution in Croatia, founded in 1820 by the decree of the Dalmatian government in Zadar. Some 150,000 artifacts cover prehistoric times, the period of Greek colonization of the Adriatic, Roman Provincial and Early Christian era to the early Middle Ages and the period of Croatian popular rulers). Of special interest is the collection of stone inscriptions from Salona and the collections of Graeco-Hellenistic ceramic objects, Roman glass, ancient clay lamps, bone and metal articles, as well as the collection of gems. In addition, the museum houses an extensive collection of ancient and medieval coins, a submarine archaeological collection, and a rich archive library.

The Museum of Croatian Archaeological Monuments is the only museum in Croatia dedicated to researching and presenting cultural artifacts of the Croats in the Middle Ages, between the 7th and 15th centuries, particularly the time of the early medieval Croatian state from 9th to 12th century. The collection of early medieval wicker, clay figurines, and old Croatian Latin epigraphic monuments is the largest collection of its kind in Europe.

The Split City Museum at Papalićeva 1, is housed in the former Papalić Palace. The collection presents the urban, cultural, artistic and economic heritage of the city. The museum is also home to the Emanuel Vidović Gallery, dedicated to the most important Split painter of the 20th century.

The Ethnographical Museum at Severova 1, has a wide range of ethnographic content mainly from Dalmatia. Founded in 1910, the museum collects original and contemporary applications of traditional heritage. They also track contemporary popular culture living with traces of old foundations and preserve and promote the value of folk heritage, renewing them and presenting exhibitions.

The Croatian Maritime Museum at Glagoljaška 18 – Tvrđava Gripe has a collection of marine equipment and supplies, weapons and navigation equipment, medals, ship models, uniforms and equipment, and related artwork. A permanent exhibition is planned to complete the presentation of military maritime and naval history, with a presentation that covers the period from the arrival of the Slavs to the present day.

The Split Science Museum and Zoo located at Kolombatovićevo šetalište 2 on the Marjan peninsula.

The Gallery of Fine Arts, located at Kralja Tomislava 15, is an art museum that contains works from the 14th century to the present day providing an overview of the artistic developments in the local art scene. The gallery was founded in 1931, and has a permanent exhibition of paintings and sculptures that includes works by major Croatian artists such as Vlaho Bukovac, Mato Celestin Medović, Branislav Dešković, Ivan Meštrović, Emanuel Vidović and Ignjat Job. The gallery also has an extensive collection of icons, and holds special exhibits of works by contemporary artists. In May 2009, the gallery opened its new premises in the old Split Hospital building behind Diocletian's Palace.

The Ivan Meštrović Gallery, on the Marjan peninsula is an art museum dedicated to the work of the 20th-century sculptor, Ivan Meštrović. The gallery displays some of his most significant work, and the building itself is an art monument. The permanent collection includes works of sculpture, drawings, design, furniture and architecture. The gallery building and grounds were based on original plans by Meštrović himself, and included living and working areas, as well as exhibition spaces. Not far from the Gallery lies Kaštelet-Crikvine, a restored chapel that houses a set of wooden wall panels carved by Ivan Meštrović.

Other notable artists from Split include Oskar Herman, Tina Morpurgo, Emanuel Vidović, and Paško Vučetić.

Music
One of the most recognisable aspects of Split culture is popular music. Notable composers include Josip Hatze, Ivo Tijardović, Zdenko Runjić – some of the most influential musicians in former Yugoslavia. Also, the more notable musicians and bands from Split are Oliver Dragojević, Gibonni, Daleka Obala, Magazin, Severina, Dino Dvornik, Jasmin Stavros, Neno Belan, Goran Karan, Dražen Zečić, Doris Dragović, Jelena Rozga, Tutti Frutti, Siniša Vuco, Meri Cetinić and guitar player Petar Čulić. There is great cultural activity during summers, when the prestigious Split Music Festival is held, followed by the Split Summer (Splitsko ljeto) theater festival. Since 2013, the Ultra Europe electronic music festival is held at the Poljud stadium in July.

Split also developed a prominent hip hop scene, with notable acts such as The Beat Fleet, Dječaci, Kiša Metaka and ST!llness.

Sports

Sportsmen are traditionally held in high regard in Split, and the city is famous for producing many champions. The most popular sports in Split are association football, tennis, basketball, swimming, rowing, sailing, waterpolo, athletics, and handball. Residents of Split prefer to call their city as "the sportiest city in the world".
The main football club is HNK Hajduk Split, one of the most popular clubs in Croatia supported by a large fan association known as Torcida Split, while RNK Split is the city's second club. Torcida Split is the oldest fan group in Europe estimated 1950. The largest football stadium is the Poljud Stadium (Hajduk's ground), with around 35,000 capacity (55,000 prior to the renovation to an all-seater). Slaven Bilić, Aljoša Asanović, Igor Tudor, and Stipe Pletikosa are some of the famous Split natives who started their careers at Hajduk. Basketball is also popular, and the city basketball club, KK Split, holds the record of winning the EuroLeague three consecutive times (1989–1991), with notable players like Toni Kukoč and Dino Rađa, both of whom are Split natives.

Former WWE wrestler and WWE Hall of Fame member Josip Peruzović, better known as Nikolai Volkoff, was born in Split.

Split's most famous tennis players are the retired 2001 Wimbledon champion Goran Ivanišević, Mario Ančić (Super Mario), Nikola Pilić and Željko Franulović. Marina Eraković was also born in Split.

Members of the local rowing club HVK Gusar won numerous Olympic and World Championship medals.

Swimming also has a long tradition in Split, with Đurđica Bjedov (1968 Olympic gold medal and Olympic record in the 100 m breaststroke), Duje Draganja and Vanja Rogulj as the most famous swimmers from the city. As a member of the ASK Split athletics club, the champion Blanka Vlašić also originates from the city. The biggest sports events to be held in Split were the 1979 Mediterranean Games, and the 1990 European Athletics Championships.

Split was one of the host cities of the 2009 World Men's Handball Championship. The city constructed a new sporting arena for the event, the Spaladium Arena. Its capacity is around 12,000 spectators (in basketball events). The cost of the arena was evenly divided between the city and the government. Ivano Balić, two time IHF World Player of the Year is the most famous handball player to come from Split.

Split used to be the home to three top-level water polo clubs, the winners of many domestic and international titles: Jadran (twice LEN Champions League winner), Mornar (LEN Cup Winners' Cup winner) and now defunct POŠK (one LEN Champions League, one LEN Super Cup and two times LEN Cup Winners' Cup winner). Many players from Split have participated at the Olympic Games, World, and European Championships, both for Croatia and Yugoslavia, having won a lot of medals. Several water polo players from Split have been considered the best in the world during their careers: Ratko Rudić, Damir Polić, Milivoj Bebić, and Deni Lušić.

Picigin is a traditional local sport (originating in 1908), played on the famous sandy Bačvice beach. It is played in very shallow water (just ankle-deep) with a small ball. Picigin is played by five players. The ball is the peeled tennis ball. There is a tradition of playing picigin in Split on New Year's Day, regardless of the weather conditions, in spite of the sea temperature rarely exceeding .

RK Nada were the pioneers of rugby union in this part of the World. They were by far the strongest club in the former Yugoslavia and they are also by far the most successful club in modern-day Croatia.

Baseball in Split is one of the city's longest sporting traditions. Although the sport began semi-officially in December 1918 when a group of US sailors from a ship in port introduced the game to some young Croats, it was not until 1972 when a pair of teachers at a local school formed the Salona Baseball Club, named after the ancient Roman city of Salona. The first actual game played in Split was on 9 September 1978 between Split (the new team moved here and was called Nada) and Jezice from Ljubljana, a 20–1 romp for the locals. A schedule of games began in earnest and by 1980 there were regular league games. The next major milestone was in 1983 when the World Baseball Federation (IBAF) accepted Yugoslavia as an official member. The Croatian National Baseball Federation was established in 1989.

Today the Croatian national baseball team (with 10 or more members coming from Split's Nada team) is ranked 25th in the world. Split's team, Nada, plays its home games at the old Hajduk stadium, where the rugby club also plays. Without a mound, it is not a regulation field. The team's main rival is Zagreb and there are teams from half a dozen other cities around the country. In addition to playing other Croatian teams, inter-league games are played and the team travels to Belgrade and other cities to play. Although not a professional team or league, some player/coaches are paid. Several have pro experience and the new coach of the national team was a former major league pitcher with the LA Dodgers. The source material here is from Mladen Cukrov's book There's No Ball Like Baseball (Nima baluna do bejzbola) and from the writer's experience as an assistant coach of the team for several years.

The Split SeaWolves club is the only American football team in Dalmatia. Active from 2008, they are currently still developing and the main focus is on a flag football team.

Transportation

Split is an important transport center for Dalmatia and the wider region. In addition to the Zagreb-Split freeway (A1), the traffic along the Adriatic coast on the Adriatic Highway from Rijeka to Dubrovnik flows through the city. The local public transport company Promet Split runs bus lines in the city and into the surroundings. There is no tram since the city is unsuitable for it due to its hilly geography.

The Split Airport in Kaštela, located about 20 km outside of Split, is the second largest in Croatia in terms of passenger numbers (3,301,930 in 2019). It has services to national and some European destinations year-round and sees lots of additional seasonal connections in the summer.

The Port of Split, which serves 4 million passengers every year, is the third busiest port in the Mediterranean. It connects Split to the nearby central Dalmatian islands Brač, Hvar and Šolta, as well as the more distant Vis, Korčula, Mljet and Lastovo. There are also routes to Rijeka, Dubrovnik, and Ancona in Italy and additional seasonal routes to further destinations in Italy. Split is also becoming a major cruise ship destination, with over 260 ship visits, carrying 130,000 passengers.

Split has a railway station located in the city center just near the main port (in the souther part of peninsula), which serves as a terminus for Croatian Railways' long-distance limited-stop service trains (which run between Split and country's capital city Zagreb) and commuter trains which run between Split and Kaštel Stari as a part of Split Suburban Railway. There are also summer-seasonal limited-stop overnight trains between Split and Osijek/Vukovar (passenger service provided by Croatian Railways), Budapest (passenger service provided by MAV), Vienna/Bratislava (passenger service provided by ÖBB AND ŽSSK). Other than the terminus station, the city has one additional train station "Split Predgrađe" (lit. "Split Suburbia") located in the part of the city called "Kopilica" (in the norhern part of peninsula) which is served by both long-distance and commuter trains.

International relations

Twin towns—Sister cities
Split is twinned with:
 Ancona, Italy
 Antofagasta, Chile
 Beit Shemesh, Israel
 Charlottenburg-Wilmersdorf (Berlin), Germany
 Cockburn, Australia
 Dover, United Kingdom
 Gladsaxe, Denmark
 Kraków, Poland
 Los Angeles, United States
 Mostar, Bosnia and Herzegovina
 Odesa, Ukraine
 Ostrava, Czech Republic
 Rzeszów, Poland
 Sarandë, Albania
 Štip, North Macedonia
 Trondheim, Norway, since 1956
 Velenje, Slovenia

Partnerships
Split is partnered with:
 Beirut, Lebanon
 Bandar Lampung, Indonesia
 Cagli, Italy
 Cetinje, Montenegro
 Iquique, Chile
 İzmir, Turkey
 Kermanshah, Iran
 Patras, Greece
 Pescara, Italy
 Punta Arenas, Chile
 Rosario, Argentina

See also

Dalmatia
Diocletian's Palace
List of ancient cities in Illyria
Split-Dalmatia County
Church of Holy Trinity, Split
Stato da Màr

References

Sources

Further reading

External links

 

Split
3rd-century BC establishments
Cities and towns in Croatia
Dalmatia
Illyrian Croatia
Greek colonies in Illyria
Kingdom of Dalmatia
Mediterranean port cities and towns in Croatia
Populated coastal places in Croatia
Populated places established in the 3rd century BC
Populated places in Split-Dalmatia County
Port cities and towns of the Adriatic Sea
World Heritage Sites in Croatia
Territories of the Republic of Venice